Uncial 0226 (in the Gregory-Aland numbering), is a Greek uncial manuscript of the New Testament. The manuscript paleographically had been assigned to the 5th-century. It contains a small parts of the First Epistle to the Thessalonians (4:16-5:5), on 1 parchment leaf (17 cm by 12 cm). It is written in two columns per page, 25 lines per page.

Text
The Greek text of this codex is mixed. Aland placed it in Category III.

Currently it is dated by the INTF to the 5th-century.

The text of the codex was published in 1946 by Peter Sanz.

Guglielmo Cavallo published a facsimile of the codex.

The manuscript was added to the list of the New Testament manuscripts by Kurt Aland in 1953.

Location
The codex currently is housed at the Austrian National Library, in Vienna, with the shelf number Pap. G. 31489.

See also 

 1 Thessalonians 4, 5
 List of New Testament uncials
 Textual criticism

References

Further reading 

 G. Cavallo, Ricerche sulla maiuscola biblica (Firenze: Le Monnier 1967), p. 49b. 
 

Greek New Testament uncials
5th-century biblical manuscripts
Biblical manuscripts of the Austrian National Library